"Fuck You" (stylized as "Fuck You!" or "F**k You!"), known as "Forget You" or "FU" for the clean versions, is a song by American recording artist CeeLo Green.  It was written as a collaboration among Green, Bruno Mars, his production team the Smeezingtons, and Brody Brown. It was released on August 19, 2010, as the first single from Green's third solo studio album, The Lady Killer (2010). "Fuck You" received acclaim from music critics, and was an international commercial success, making the top-10 in thirteen countries, including topping charts in the UK, and number two on the Billboard Hot 100.

Inspiration
In an interview with NME, Green said that, in addition to being about a heartbreak, the song was also about the music industry itself.

Versions
Several versions of "Fuck You" have been released. The version of the song edited to remove swearing, which is broadcast in the music video on UK television stations, and played on US radio, is called "Forget You", while the UK radio edit is entitled "FU". All three versions differ in lyrical content, with "Fuck You" being completely uncensored, "Forget You" replacing the profanity with sound effects (also changing "fuck you" to "forget you" per the title), and "FU" replacing them by editing them out completely and leaving blank spaces, and changing "fuck you" to an exact pronunciation of "F you". All three versions can be found on iTunes and both "Fuck You" and "Forget You" are included in an extended play, which features the music video and lyric video, and was released on August 19, 2010, whereas "FU" was not released until September 21.

A fourth version of the song, featuring American rapper 50 Cent, was released to iTunes. The version was entitled "Fuck You (Heartbreaker)!", and was released only in America. The video for this version of the song incorporates scenes from the original video with extra shots of 50 Cent performing. CeeLo performed a remix of the song, featuring an all-female backing band named "Scarlet Fever", on The Colbert Report on November 9, 2010. The remix was entitled "Fuck You (Fox News)". The first full verse of the song was a satirical parody of Fox News controversies. A fifth version of the song, entitled "Thank You", was released on May 9, 2011. The song was re-written with new lyrics as a tribute to firefighters. The lyrics mention that Cee Lo's mother was a firefighter. A new version of the video was released with scenes of Cee Lo visiting a fire station.

Music video
Initially, a lyric video for "Fuck You" was released to YouTube on August 19, 2010, featuring kinetic typography, with the lyrics of the song appearing on different colored backgrounds with film grain overlaid on the video. The same thing was done in the German and Spanish versions of the video, translating the lyrics, although the vocals remained in English.

The official music video was released on September 1, 2010. The video was directed by Matt Stawski and was filmed at Cadillac Jack's, a movie prop diner located in the Sun Valley area of Los Angeles. Taking place in a diner, the video chronicles Cee Lo's misadventures with a girl he has a crush on, known as "The Heartbreaker" throughout the video. In the beginning, a young Cee Lo goes into the diner with his parents and goes up to the Heartbreaker, who is sitting with another boy. He offers to let the Heartbreaker play with his toy garbage truck, but she ignores him and walks away with the other boy, who has a toy Ferrari F40. In his high school years, Cee Lo works at the diner as a dishwasher. He attempts to woo the Heartbreaker with a bouquet of flowers but slips on fries deliberately dropped by another boy. The flowers fly out of his hand and land on a much younger girl's lap. During his college years, Cee Lo studies in the diner with another woman implied to be his music tutor. He then attempts to woo the Heartbreaker by having the waitress draw a heart-shaped ketchup mark on her hot dog plate, but the Heartbreaker approaches him with a basket of fries and spills them on his shirt, leaving a large ketchup stain on it. Cee Lo then goes through an epiphany in his life and the video fast-forwards to the present day, when Cee Lo is now known as "The Lady Killer" and has a fancy Cadillac Eldorado with his backup singers in the back seat. He drives past the diner to find the Heartbreaker working there, sweeping the front entrance while others are dancing behind her. Cee Lo waves at the Heartbreaker before driving away. The final shot is of him waving at the camera and the words "The Lady Killer" appearing on screen, before the shot freezes, thus ending the video.

The radio edit version of the video contains re-shot elements that have been mixed with parts from the original, most notably when Cee Lo is on screen and he is singing alternative lyrics, but he is not shown singing the clean lyrics in the titular chorus. Some parts of the video tend to freeze for a split second when a bowdlerized lyric is being mouthed to prevent the lips from being read. At the start of the explicit version and clean version titled FU, the mother of the young Cee Lo Green can be seen to look very shocked and taps him on the shoulder to make him turn around when he first swears. This does not happen in the clean version titled Forget You.

Commercial performance
In the US, "Fuck You" debuted at No. 69 on Hot Digital Songs and No. 96 on the Billboard Hot 100. The song originally peaked at number 9 in 2010, but following Cee Lo's performance of the song at the 53rd Grammy Awards, "Fuck You" had a resurgence in popularity and climbed back up the Billboard Hot 100 chart, reaching No. 2 in its 26th chart week (making it one of the slowest climbs ever into the number 2 position) tying it with Cee Lo's previous 2006 hit "Crazy" from his musical duo project Gnarls Barkley as his highest-charting single. The song remained at No. 2 for four consecutive weeks. In all, the single spent a total of 48 weeks on the Hot 100. It was certified Gold on November 5, 2010.

The week of March 24, 2011, the song was the best-selling song in the USA of 2011, having been sold 1,865,000 times in 2011 only, despite the song never reaching No. 1 and being released in August 2010. In the subsequent week, the song surpassed 2 million copies in sales in 2011 alone, bringing its total to 3,707,000 copies. The week of April 16, 2011, the song topped the Pop Songs radio airplay chart in its 25th week, completing the longest journey to the summit in the ranking's 18-year history. "Fuck You" would go on to share the record with Demi Lovato's 2012 single "Give Your Heart a Break" before it was eventually broken by Alessia Cara's "Here" in 2016. As of April 2013, "Fuck You" had sold over 6 million copies in the U.S.

Critical reception
"Fuck You" received acclaim from music critics. Jason Lipshutz from Billboard gave "Fuck You" a positive review stating, "it's as sunny as a '60s Motown hit and as expletive-laden as an early Eminem song, a combination that fits the singer's sky-high vocals and offbeat sense of humor well. Over a twinkling piano line, bumping bass and steady percussion, Green shakes off a failed relationship with a gold digger by packing the simple pleasures of old-school soul music into tongue-in-cheek verses and a suitably soaring chorus." Nick Levine of Digital Spy gave the song four out of five stars writing: "As its title suggests, 'Fuck You' is essentially a middle finger extending from the fist of a pop single—and a gloriously catchy Motown stomper of a pop single at that." Alexandra Patsavas, music supervisor for the "Twilight" films, praised Mars' ability to veer between "a beautifully crafted pop song exquisitely sung" and the likes of Cee-Lo's "Fuck You". "How sublime that an artist can travel so fluidly between humor and earnestness," she remarked.

Accolades
At the 53rd Grammy Awards, "Fuck You" was nominated for Record of the Year and Song of the Year, and won Best Urban/Alternative Performance. The video was also nominated for Best Short Form Music Video. It was named the #1 song of 2010 by Time, and made the top of Metacritic's users poll.  Spin and The Village Voices Pazz & Jop critics' poll named "Fuck You" the best single of 2010. In October 2011, NME placed it at number 112 on its list "150 Best Tracks of the Past 15 Years".

Live performances
Cee Lo toured with an all-female backing band named Scarlet Fever, performing "Fuck You" on
Taratata, at the Reeperbahn Festival, Later... with Jools Holland, Late Show with David Letterman, the 31st annual Children in Need telethon, the Christmas edition of BBC One chart show Top of the Pops, Saturday Night Live and many other venues. Cee Lo also performed at the 53rd Grammy Awards on February 10, 2011, with actress Gwyneth Paltrow and several puppets provided by The Jim Henson Company. Two days later, he sang at the 2011 BRIT Awards alongside UK singer Paloma Faith. On August 14, Cee Lo sang at WWE's 2011 Summerslam pay-per-view event in Los Angeles with the addition of WWE Divas dancing to "Fuck You" at the event's venue.

Track listings

 FU
 "FU" (Clean version) – 3:42
 "FU" (Semi-clean version) – 3:42

 Fuck You
CD single
 "Fuck You!" - 3:42
 "Georgia" – 3:46

Maxi-single
 "Fuck You!" – 3:42
 "Forget You" – 3:42
 "Forget You" (Le Castle Vania remix) – 4:38
 "Georgia" – 3:46

Digital single
 "Fuck You" – 3:42
 "Forget You" – 3:42
 "Fuck You" (Video) – 3:42
 "Fuck You" (Lyric video) – 3:42

12-inch vinyl single
 "Fuck You" – 3:42
 "Fuck You" (Instrumental) – 3:42

 Fuck You (Heartbreaker)
 "Fuck You (Heartbreaker)" (featuring 50 Cent) – 4:05

 Thank You
 "Thank You" – 4:01

Credits and personnel
Mixing and mastering
Mixed at Larrabee Sound Studios, Hollywood, California; mastered at Sterling Sound, New York, New York; engineered at Levcon Studios, Hollywood, California.

Personnel
Songwriting – Cee Lo Green, Bruno Mars, Philip Lawrence, Ari Levine
Production – The Smeezingtons (Bruno Mars, Phillip Lawrence, Ari Levine)
Mixing – Manny Marroquin
Assistant – Christian Plata, Erik Madrid
Mastering – Chris Gehringer
Engineer – Ari Levine
All instruments– Ari Levine, Bruno Mars, Brody Brown

Credits adapted from the liner notes of The Lady Killer, Elektra Records

Charts and certifications

Weekly charts

Year-end charts

Decade-end charts

Certifications

Release history

See also
 List of Dutch Top 40 number-one singles of 2010
 List of 2010s Scottish number-one singles
 List of UK R&B Chart number-one singles of 2010
 List of UK Singles Chart number ones of the 2010s

References

2010 songs
2010 singles
CeeLo Green songs
Song recordings produced by the Smeezingtons
Songs written by Bruno Mars
Songs written by Philip Lawrence (songwriter)
Songs written by Ari Levine
Songs written by CeeLo Green
Dutch Top 40 number-one singles
Number-one singles in Scotland
UK Singles Chart number-one singles
Grammy Award for Best Urban/Alternative Performance
Elektra Records singles
Obscenity controversies in music
Songs written by Christopher Brody Brown